Asteridea asteroides  is a herb in the Asteraceae family, which is endemic to Western Australia.  It was first described in 1853 by Nikolai Turczaninow as Trichostegia asteroides.  In 1980, G. Kroner assigned it to the genus, Asteridea, giving it the name Asteridea asteroides. It is a perennial herb, growing on sand or gravelly sand to heights of from 5 cm to 30 cm. Its white flowers may seen from August to November in Beard's South-West Province.

References

External links 
 Asteridea asteroides occurrence data from the Australasian Virtual Herbarium

asteroides
Endemic flora of Western Australia
Eudicots of Western Australia
Plants described in 1851